Bangladesh Association of Software and Information Services (BASIS)  is the national association of Software and information and communication technologies companies in Bangladesh.

History 
Bangladesh Association of Software and Information Services (BASIS) was established in 1997.

In June 2016, Mustafa Jabar was elected president of BASIS after his Digital Brigade Panel won seven of the nine directorships. The elections at this point were held triennially.

On March 27, 2018, it was reported that the Bangladesh government had repealed the election of BASIS, which had been scheduled for March 31. The move extended the tenure for six months of BASIS's executive committee. Syed Almas Kabir was later elected president on March 31, 2018, when the elections were held anyway upon request of the commerce ministry.

In April 2018, BASIS started the Commonwealth-SheTrades initiative, with funding from the UK Department for International Development. In May 2018, the BASIS website was hacked by a Myanmar hacking group. According to Al Jazeera in 2018, BASIS is "the biggest umbrella organization representing the country's IT sector." BASIS has offices in Dhaka.
 
In August 2018, BASIS publicly implored RAJUK to allow BASIS members operating software companies out of commercial zones to continue operating, noting that the commercial zones then open did not allow such companies to remain open all day. BASIS at the time said that 800 of its 1,100 members had offices in non-commercial areas.

BASIS OUTSOURCING AWARD 
BASIS Outsourcing Award is an award to recognize the outstanding performance of organizations and individuals in the field of outsourcing software and ITES services. In 2011, BASIS created the BASIS Outsourcing Award. This award program will make attempt to identify the best performers in the outsourcing industry/community. BASIS organizes its Outsourcing Award annually to celebrate and reward the success of companies and individuals who outperforms in its fields.

ICT Award 
In July 2017, BASIS created the National ICT Awards. In July 2018, BASIS launched the second national ICT award.

BASIS Project
 Software Technology Park −1 (STP-1)
 BASIS Institute of Technology & Management (BITM)
 BASIS-A2I Joint Project for national portal framework development
 CBI-IT Outsourcing Export Coaching Program
 BASIS Softexpo
 Support to Kaliakoir Hi-Tech Park Project (BASIS in collaboration with Bangladesh Hi-Tech park Authority)
 Leveraging ICT (LICT) Project (With the support of Ministry of ICT)

BASIS Softexpo
BASIS organizes an annual exposition called BASIS SoftExpo, it is the largest private-sector exposition aimed at showcasing IT and ITES products and services in Bangladesh. The 17th BASIS SoftExpo is going to be held on 23-26 February 2023.

References

External links
 
 

Business organisations based in Bangladesh
Science and technology in Bangladesh
Technology trade associations
Organizations established in 1997
1997 establishments in Bangladesh